Busan Dongcheon High School is a private school for those graduating from middle school. The school was established in 1980, and is located in Nam-gu, Busan. It is one of the eighty-four high schools in Busan.

The school is the only high-school run by The Cheondoism Foundation, a Korean traditional religion.

The school gives education based on "human is god" motto, and the religion of the school is Cheondoism. Graduates have made significant contributions in many fields.

See also
 High School

External links 
 Busan Dongcheon High School website (Korean)

References 

High schools in South Korea
Educational institutions established in 1980
Education in Busan
Religion in Korea
Nam District, Busan